The 2008–09 Mestis season was the ninth season of the Mestis, the second level of ice hockey in Finland. 12 teams participated in the league, and Sport won the championship.

Standings

Playoffs

Qualification

Titaanit got relegated to Suomi-sarja.

External links
 Season on hockeyarchives.info

Fin
2008–09 in Finnish ice hockey
Mestis seasons